Mordellistena mutabilis is a species of beetle in the genus Mordellistena of the family Mordellidae, which is part of the superfamily Tenebrionoidea. It was discovered in 1891.

References

Beetles described in 1891
mutabilis